The vaginal venous plexus is a group of veins draining blood from the vagina. It lies around the sides of the vagina. Its blood is eventually into the internal iliac veins.

Structure 
The vaginal venous plexus lies around the sides of the vagina. Its branches communicate with the uterine venous plexuses, vesical venous plexus, and rectal venous plexuses. It is drained by the vaginal veins, one on either side. These eventually drain into the internal iliac veins (hypogastric veins).

Function 
The vaginal venous plexus drains blood from the vagina. It helps to make the vagina highly vascular.

References 

Veins of the torso